Terence Linatoc (born June 7, 1994) is a Filipino-Canadian footballer currently playing with Durham United FA in League1 Ontario.

Playing career 
Linatoc began his career in 2011 in the Canadian Soccer League with SC Toronto B in the Second Division, where he recorded ten goals. In 2012, he enrolled into York University to play college soccer for two seasons. In 2016, he went overseas to play with Stallion Laguna F.C. in the newly formed Philippines Football League. He played in League1 Ontario in 2019 with Durham United FA.

References 

1994 births
Living people
Canadian Soccer League (1998–present) players
Canadian soccer players
Filipino footballers
SC Toronto players
Citizens of the Philippines through descent
Stallion Laguna F.C. players
Soccer players from Toronto
Sportspeople from Scarborough, Toronto
Association football defenders
Association football forwards
Pickering FC players